Räterichsbodensee is a lake in Guttannen, Oberhasli, Switzerland. It is connected to the river Aare.

See also
List of lakes of Switzerland
List of mountain lakes of Switzerland

External links

Lake Räterichsboden

Reservoirs in Switzerland
Bernese Oberland
Oberhasli
Lakes of the canton of Bern